Anne Robb (born 27 July 1959) is a British former alpine skier who competed in the 1976 Winter Olympics and in the 1980 Winter Olympics.

References

External links
 

1959 births
Living people
British female alpine skiers
Olympic alpine skiers of Great Britain
Alpine skiers at the 1976 Winter Olympics
Alpine skiers at the 1980 Winter Olympics
Place of birth missing (living people)